Brian T. Walsh (born 24 April 1951) is a former Australian rules footballer who played for Carlton and Essendon in the Victorian Football League (VFL) during the 1970s.

From Sandhurst, Walsh had his best year in 1973 when he won Carlton's Best Clubman Award and topped their goalkicking with 60 goals, including a bag of eight against South Melbourne at Lake Oval. He was a rover in the 1973 Grand Final but finished on the losing team.

In 1975 he joined Essendon and kicked exactly 100 goals for the club over four seasons. He finished his career at Werribee and was their captain-coach in 1981, winning Werribee's 'Best and fairest'.

Walsh coached the Wangaratta Football Club in 1993, losing a close Ovens & Murray Football League Preliminary Final by three points.

References

Blueseum profile

1951 births
Living people
Australian rules footballers from Victoria (Australia)
Carlton Football Club players
Essendon Football Club players
Werribee Football Club players
Werribee Football Club coaches
Sandhurst Football Club players